Kilbennen or Kilbannon is a medieval ecclesiastical site and National Monument located in County Galway, Ireland.

Location

History

The monastery here was founded by Benignus of Armagh (Benin, Benen, Bennan), a disciple of Saint Patrick, in the 5th century AD, although the Book of Armagh associates it with a different Benignus, of the Luighne Connacht. Iarlaithe mac Loga (Saint Jarlath) studied here in the 6th century.

The Annals of the Four Masters record the burning of Kilbennen in 1114. In 1148 they record the death of Ceallach Ua Domhnagain, "noble head of Cill-Beneoin."

The Franciscans built a church c. 1428.

Some conservation work was done in 1880–81.

Ruins and monuments

Both gables are standing on the church. The east gable had a twin-light cusped ogee-headed window.

A holy well is located to the northwest, where Bennin is said to have healed nine lepers.

References

External links

Religion in County Galway
Archaeological sites in County Galway
National Monuments in County Galway
Round towers